Laget is a village in Tvedestrand municipality in Agder county, Norway. The village is located at the inner end of the Sandnesfjorden, along the Norwegian County Road 411. Laget Church is located in the village.

References

Villages in Agder
Tvedestrand